Simon James King (born 20 October 1966) is an English television presenter, best known as one half of the Hairy Bikers with Dave Myers. Together they have presented a number of television cookery series for BBC television and have since launched an online weight loss programme, 'The Hairy Bikers Diet Club'.

Early life
King was born in Kibblesworth, County Durham. An alumnus of St Robert of Newminster Catholic School in Washington, he once stated that he "went through a phase of wanting to be a priest when I was about 13, but soon discovered girls and music were way more interesting." King's father served in the Royal Navy during World War II on the Arctic convoys and was then employed as a motorcycle despatch rider.

Aged 16 Si worked laying paving stones for a construction firm. He then worked in film and television production. He was assistant location manager on Harry Potter and the Philosopher's Stone and location manager on Harry Potter and the Chamber of Secrets. He met Dave Myers in 1995 on the set of a TV drama entitled The Gambling Man on which he was the second assistant director.

Career

Hairy Bikers

The duo first appeared on the BBC's The Hairy Bikers' Cookbook. Their TV shows are a mixture of cookery and travelogue, using a similar style to that previously associated with chef Keith Floyd, including the habit of frequently referring to the cameraman and other crew. Most shows featured the pair riding motorbikes, including the BMW R1200GS, F650GS and Triumph Rocket III.

In summer 2009 they filmed a 30-part daytime series for BBC Two, The Hairy Bikers' Food Tour of Britain, which aired weekdays starting on 24 August 2009. The series saw them visit a different county each day and cook what they considered to be that county's signature dish.
A new six part series titled The Hairy Bikers: Mums Know Best commenced broadcast in early January 2010 on BBC Two.

On 25 October 2010 a new 40 episode series, The Hairy Bikers' Cook Off, was launched on BBC Two. The programme includes a cook off between two families, and celebrity guests.
From January to May 2010, the Hairy Bikers performed their "Big Night Out" show in theatres throughout the UK. Directed by Bob Mortimer, the show was a fun mixture of cooking and chat with a little song and dance thrown in. It explored their youth, how they met and their love of food.
In June 2011, the Bikers appeared in the second series of Mum Knows Best. The series, made up of eight episodes, featured three 'Star Mums' whose recipes were tested and shared with the public.

October 2011 saw a new series, Meals on Wheels, air on BBC Two. The series fronted a campaign to save local 'meals on wheels' services around the UK. From November to December 2011, the Bikers appeared in a 30-part BBC series called Hairy Bikers: Best of British, airing at 3:45pm on BBC Two (apart from the show's final week, in which it aired on BBC One). The series celebrated British recipes and championed local produce. In January 2012, continuing into February, BBC Two showed hour long re-versions including recipes from various episodes of the series.

After they had signed new contracts with the BBC in 2011, a new series was commissioned. The Hairy Biker's Bakeation sees Si and Dave doing what they love best - a gastronomic road trip, uncovering the best baking on offer across Europe, from Norway, the Low Countries (Netherlands, Belgium and Luxembourg), Germany, Eastern Europe (Slovakia, Hungary and Romania), Austria, Italy and France to Spain.

In March 2012, Good Food commissioned The Hairy Biker's Mississippi Adventure, the duo's first series for the channel. In August 2012, Hairy Dieters: How to Love Food and Lose Weight showed how the Hairy Bikers radically changed lifestyles, but stayed true to their love of great food, as they embarked on a campaign to lose two-and-a-half stone in three months, and comfortably passed their target weights.

After having experienced their own success with balancing eating the food they love while also being conscious of their health and losing weight, they wanted to help others to do the same. In January 2014, the boys launched The Hairy Bikers Diet Club which includes recipes and tips and tricks to help people to live a healthier and trimmer life, not starving to be "skinny minnies".

In February 2014, they launched a new series, The Hairy Bikers' Asian Adventure for BBC Two which sees them travelling in Asia sampling the local cuisine, meeting local people and cooking up some native dishes themselves.

Personal life

In 2014 King suffered an intracranial aneurysm from which he recovered after hospital treatment.

In 2015, King co-wrote an autobiography with Dave Myers, entitled The Hairy Bikers: Blood, Sweat and Tyres.

In September 2017, along with his 'Hairy Bikers' partner Dave Myers he was initiated into the showbusiness charity the Grand Order of Water Rats. They were both sponsored by Rick Wakeman.

King is a supporter of Premier League football team Newcastle United F.C. King lives near Newcastle and has three children.

References

External links
Hairy Bikers Official Google+ 
Hairy Bikers Diet Club

1966 births
Living people
People from County Durham (before 1974)
English chefs
English people of German descent
English people of Swedish descent
English people of Italian descent                 
English television chefs
English autobiographers